Badī Khayrī (18 August 1893 – February 1966) was an Egyptian folk lyricist and playwright. He was one of the folk lyricists who took their words and inspiration from old traditional Egyptian folk stories and popular street songs sung by the masses in festivities. Khayri wrote several stories for films such as El Hub Keda (1961).

References 

Egyptian dramatists and playwrights
Egyptian writers
1893 births
1966 deaths
Date of death missing
Place of birth missing
Place of death missing